Lopha is a genus of marine bivalve molluscs in the family Ostreidae.

The genus Lopha is present from the Triassic period in the Lower Norian age (216.5 ± 2.0 – 203.6 ± 1.5 Mya) to the recent age.

Description
Lopha species have thick, strongly ribbed shells with unequal valves. The margins of  the valves have a characteristic zig-zag pattern. The lower valve shows finger-like outgrowths, by which the molluscs adhere to the substrate. These molluscs are stationary, epifaunal, suspension feeders, as they feed by filtering sea water to extract the nutrients.

Species
 Lopha affinis Sowerby, 1871
 Lopha capsa Fischer von Waldheim, 1808
 Lopha chemnitzii Hanley, 1846
 Lopha cristagalli C. Linnaeus, 1758
 Lopha frons C. Linnaeus, 1758
 Lopha imbricata J. B. Lamarck, 1819
 Lopha rosacea G. P. Deshayes, 1836

Fossil species
Lopha gregarea, Oxfordian (stage) (160 mya)
Lopha marshii (Sowerby, 1914), Bajocian (170 mya)

Gallery

References
Biolib
WoRMS
Animal Diversity
Paleobiology Database
Sepkoski, Jack Sepkoski's Online Genus Database

Ostreidae
Bivalve genera
Extant Triassic first appearances